Alexander Gomelsky Universal Sports Hall CSKA, also known as USH CSKA, and formerly known as CSKA Palace of Sports, is a multi-purpose indoor sporting arena that is located in Moscow, Russia. It is a part of the CSKA Sports Complex. The arena is primarily used to host basketball and futsal games, but it can also be used to host boxing matches, volleyball games, handball games, tennis, gymnastics, artistic gymnastics, wrestling, fencing, martial arts, and other sports. The arena can also be used for dancing and other entertainment events. The seating capacity of the arena for basketball games 5000 people.

The arena is named in honor of the late Alexander Gomelsky, the former head basketball coach and honorary president of CSKA Moscow Basketball Club.

History
Universal Sports Hall CSKA was completed in the year 1979, during the preparations for the 1980 Summer Olympics, which were hosted by Moscow, USSR. The arena was used as a venue for the 1980 Olympics basketball tournament that was held there.

Universal Sports Hall CSKA has also been used as the long-time home arena of the basketball club, PBC CSKA Moscow. It has also been used as the home arena of futsal club, MFK CSKA Moscow.

References

External links

Eurohockey.net CSKA Universal Sports Hall
Fightlife.com CSKA Universal Sports Hall
Image of the interior of Universal Sports Hall CSKA

CSKA Moscow
Venues of the 1980 Summer Olympics
Basketball venues in Russia
Boxing venues in Russia
Indoor arenas built in the Soviet Union
Indoor arenas in Russia
Indoor track and field venues
Olympic basketball venues
Sports venues in Moscow
Tennis venues in Russia
Volleyball venues in Russia
1979 establishments in Russia
Sports venues completed in 1979
Venues of the Friendship Games